Group C of UEFA Women's Euro 2017 contained Austria, France, Iceland and Switzerland. The matches were played from 18 to 26 July 2017.

Teams

Standings

In the quarter-finals:
The winners of Group C, Austria, advance to play the runners-up of Group D, Spain.
The runners-up of Group C, France, advance to play the winners of Group D, England.

Matches
All times are local (UTC+2).

Austria vs Switzerland

France vs Iceland

Iceland vs Switzerland

France vs Austria

Switzerland vs France

Iceland vs Austria

References

External links
Official website

Group C